Portoviejo Canton is a canton of Ecuador, located in the Manabí Province.  Its capital is the city of Portoviejo.  Its population at the 2001 census was 238,430.

Demographics
Ethnic groups as of the Ecuadorian census of 2010:
Mestizo  67.9%
Montubio  20.8%
White  5.7%
Afro-Ecuadorian  5.3%
Indigenous  0.2%
Other  0.2%

References

Cantons of Manabí Province